"She's a Miracle" is a song written by J.P. Pennington and Sonny LeMaire, and recorded by American country music group Exile.  It was released in March 1985 as the third single from the album Kentucky Hearts.  The song was Exile's sixth number one on the country chart.  The single went to number one for one week and spent a total of thirteen weeks on the country chart.

Charts

Weekly charts

Year-end charts

References
 

1985 singles
Exile (American band) songs
Songs written by J.P. Pennington
Song recordings produced by Buddy Killen
Epic Records singles
1984 songs
Songs written by Sonny LeMaire